Paul Double (born 25 June 1996) is a British racing cyclist, who currently rides for UCI ProTeam .

Major results

2018
 10th Trofeo Città di San Vendemiano
2020
 4th Overall Tour of Bulgaria
2021
 7th Overall Settimana Ciclistica Italiana
 9th Trofeo Alcide Degasperi
2022
 1st Stage 2 Tour of Bulgaria
 6th Overall International Tour of Hellas
 6th Giro dell'Appennino
 7th Overall Tour of Slovenia
 8th Giro della Toscana
 9th Overall Adriatica Ionica Race

References

External links
 

1996 births
Living people
British male cyclists
Sportspeople from Winchester
21st-century British people